Elections to the Tripura Tribal Areas Autonomous District Council (TTAADC) were held on 3 May 2010. On that day elections were held for 27 of the 28 elected seats in the Autonomous District Council. In one seat (Maharani-Chellagong) the election was countermanded, following the death of Bharatiya Janata Party candidate Ranjit Jamatia. 25 of the 28 elected seats in the Autonomous District Council are reserved for Scheduled Tribes.

Security arrangements ahead of the election were tight. The Tripura Home Department had identified 91 polling stations as "hyper-sensitive" and 347 as "sensitive". Authorities in Tripura had asked the Indian government to provide an additional thirty paramilitary companies to ensure the electoral process.

There were 636,169 eligible voters. The electoral turnout stood at 83.69%. The votes were counted on 7–8 May 2010. The election result was a landslide victory for the Left Front. The Left Front, with 63.81% of the votes cast, won all 27 seats that were up for election. 25 seats went to the Communist Party of India (Marxist), one seat to the Communist Party of India and one seat to the All India Forward Bloc.

The Indian National Congress emerged as a second-largest party in the election. The party finished second in 18 seats. Amongst its candidates was Debabrata Koloi, former TTAADC Chief Executive Member. Other parties in the fray were the Indigenous Nationalist Party of Tripura, the Indigenous People's Front of Tripura (an INPT splinter-group, that campaigned for a separate TTAADC state), the National Socialist Party of Tripura, National Conference of Tripura, All India Trinamool Congress and BJP. NCT and Trinamool Congress contested in an alliance. 44 candidates were independents. In total 122 candidates had filed their nominations. The Left Front, Congress and INPT each contested all 28 seats.

Results

Source: '(ST)' indicates that the seat is reserved for Scheduled Tribes. Names of winning candidates in bold text. Left Front candidates are from CPI(M) unless stated otherwise. Only results of Left Front, Congress and INPT candidates are listed above. In the Ramchandra Ghat constituency, Saranjit Debbarma of the National Council of Tripura finished second with 2,158 votes.

See also
 2015 Tripura Tribal Areas Autonomous District Council election
 2005 Tripura Tribal Areas Autonomous District Council election
 2000 Tripura Tribal Areas Autonomous District Council election

References

2010 elections in India
Elections in Tripura
History of Tripura (1947–present)
Autonomous district council elections in India
Local elections in Tripura